Mochalyshche is a village in Nizhyn Raion of Chernihiv Oblast, Ukraine.

History 

It is unclear when exactly Mochalyshche was established. Information published by the Verkhovna Rada of Ukraine attests its founding by the first decade of the 1800s.

The village was recorded in the 1866 Russian Empire's list of settlements. It was documented to have 22 homesteads, that housed a population of 181, and whose water supply came from local wells. Mochalyshche was subsequently logged in the list of inhabited places of the Chernigov Governorate in 1902 where it was mentioned that the village's population had grown to 538.

In 1919, during the Ukrainian War of Independence, a Petliurite insurrection rose in Kozeletsky Uyezd against the White Army, led by an Ataman named . Although fighting for opposing factions, Romashka signed an armistice with the Red Army, and fought alongside them against their common enemy. Following the White Army's expulsion from the region in early 1920, Romashka's forces resumed their war with the Soviets, gaining sovereignty over Mochalyshche, and over the entirety of southern Kozeletsky Uyezd. He was then killed on 8 July 1920 by his compatriot and godfather Stepan Shuplik, a native of Mochalyshche who acted as a double-agent for the Ukrainian Cheka.

During World War II, Mochalyshche was razed as part of Nazi punitive expedition against local partisan activity. It was burnt to the ground on 18 December 1942, killing 267 civilians.:28

The village was presumably resettled by 1978, as it was documented in a  Soviet General Staff map of the area surrounding Kiev. Mochalyshche was then listed in the 1989 Soviet census, and recorded to have 145 inhabitants.

Mochalyshche was under the local administration of  rural council in Bobrovytsia Raion until 12 June 2020, when administrative reforms in Chernihiv Oblast merged Sokolivka rural council with the rural councils of Nova Basan, and Novyi Bykiv, to form Nova Basan rural hromada.:2-3 Under subsequent national administrative reform, on 19 July, Bobrovytsia Raion was merged into the newly formed Nizhyn Raion.

Demographics 

According to demographic statistics published by the Verkhovna Rada of Ukraine, as of 2012, Mochalyshche has a population of 141 people, growing by 0.7% (1 resident) from the 2001 Ukrainian population census, but declining by 2.76% (4 residents) from 1989.

Language 

In the 2001 population census, 97.16% of the population (136 residents) indicated their native language was Ukrainian, while the remaining 2.84% (4 residents) indicated it was Russian.

Notable people 

 , a Ukrainian politician, writer, and philologist.:67-80

 Stepan Maximovich Shuplik, a Ukrainian poet,:13 Soviet partisan,:202-204 and former agent of the All-Ukrainian Extraordinary Commission.

Notes

References

External links 
 Weather in Mochalyshche
 Mochalyshche in the First French Empire's "Carte de la Russie Européenne en LXXVII feuilles exécutée au Depôt general de la Guerre" [Map of European Russia in 77 sheets carried out by the Depôt General de la Guerre] (1812)
 Mochalyshche in 's map of European Russia (1871)
 Mochalyshche in the Kiev Governorate's "Karta Shuberta" [Map of Schubert] (1893)
 Mochalyshche in a topographic military map of the Red Army (1941)

Populated places established in the 1780s
Populated places established in the Russian Empire
Villages in Nizhyn Raion